Glen D. Womack is an American politician and businessman from the state of Louisiana. A Republican, Womack has represented the 32nd district of the Louisiana State Senate, covering parts of Central Louisiana, since 2020.

Womack is the founder of Womack & Sons Construction Group, a utility management and commercial construction enterprise based in Harrisonburg. In 2019, Womack ran for term-limited Republican Neil Riser's State Senate seat, winning in the first round with 50.1% of the vote.

References

Living people
People from Catahoula Parish, Louisiana
Republican Party Louisiana state senators
21st-century American politicians
Year of birth missing (living people)